The Coalition Coupon was a letter sent to parliamentary candidates at the 1918 United Kingdom general election, endorsing them as official representatives of the Coalition Government. The 1918 election took place in the heady atmosphere of victory in the First World War and the desire for revenge against Germany and its allies. Receiving the coupon was interpreted by the electorate as a sign of patriotism that helped candidates gain election, while those who did not receive it had a more difficult time as they were sometimes seen as anti-war or pacifist. The letters were all dated 20 November 1918 and were signed by Prime Minister David Lloyd George for the Coalition Liberals and Bonar Law, the leader of the Conservative Party. As a result, the 1918 general election has become known as "the coupon election".

The name "coupon" was coined by Liberal leader H. H. Asquith, disparagingly using the jargon of rationing with which people were familiar in the context of wartime shortages.

Text of the letter
The letters all contained the same simple text:

Some coalition candidates included the wording of the letter in their election addresses.

Recipients
Following confidential negotiations between Lloyd George's coalition Chief Whip, Freddie Guest, and George Younger, Chairman of the Conservative Party, over the summer of 1918, it was agreed that 150 Liberals were to be offered the support of the prime minister and the leader of the Conservative Party at the next general election.<ref>{{cite book |first=K. O. |last=Morgan |author-link=K. O. Morgan |contribution=Lloyd George’s Stage Army: The Coalition Liberals, 1918-1922 |editor-link=A. J. P. Taylor |editor-first=A. J. P. |editor-last=Taylor |title=Lloyd George: Twelve Essays |publisher=Hamish Hamilton |date=1971 |page=227}}</ref>

According to the figures recorded in Trevor Wilson's book, The Downfall of the Liberal Party'', 159 Liberal candidates received the coupon. A few of these were Independent Liberals, supporters of Asquith. Of those Liberals receiving the coupon 136 were elected, whereas only 29 who did not receive the coupon were returned to Parliament.

In addition to the Liberal and Conservative candidates who received the coupon, some letters were also sent to Labour supporters of the Coalition (although most were repudiated by the official Labour Party) and some to members of the patriotic, working class party the National Democratic Party.

Impact on Liberal candidates
As Margaret Cole’s memoir of the time makes clear, many competent and patriotic candidates who did not receive the coupon, including sitting Liberal and Labour MPs, found themselves categorised as somehow anti-war or pacifist as a result. Percy Harris, who had been MP for Harborough since 1916 recorded that once the coupon had been allocated to his Conservative opponent it was interpreted as a personal reflection upon him by his constituents who assumed he must have done something wrong for the Liberal Prime Minister to be seen offering his open support to a rival.

Most historians have since agreed that the coupon essentially sealed the fate of those Liberals who were not fortunate enough to receive the Coalition's backing. Those Liberals that Lloyd George chose to abandon were left defenceless against Coalition candidates, who had a full claim on the spirit of national unity and patriotism that characterised Britain's war weary mood following the end of hostilities.

The election result was catastrophic for these Asquithian Independent Liberals, who were decimated in the Coupon election. Only 28 were returned, and even Asquith lost the seat he had held in East Fife since the 1886 general election.

References

1918 documents
Coalition governments
1918 in the United Kingdom
1918 in British politics
Liberal Party (UK)
History of the Conservative Party (UK)
Political terms in the United Kingdom
1918 United Kingdom general election
Letters (message)
David Lloyd George
Bonar Law
H. H. Asquith